Westfield Township is one of twenty-five townships in Bureau County, Illinois, USA. As of the 2020 census, its population was 874 and it contained 421 housing units.

Geography

Villages
 Arlington
 Cherry

Cemeteries

 Arlington
 Bereans
 Calvery Catholic
 Cherry Miner's
 Lost Grove

Major highways
  Illinois Route 89

Airports and landing strips
 Funfsinn Airport
 Gerald H Hamer Airport
 Hahn Airport

Demographics
As of the 2020 census there were 874 people, 368 households, and 267 families residing in the township. The racial makeup of the township was 94.74% White, 0.57% African American, 0.00% Native American, 0.92% Asian, 0.00% Pacific Islander, 0.92% from other races, and 2.86% from two or more races. Hispanic or Latino of any race were 3.89% of the population.

There were 368 households, out of which 26.10% had children under the age of 18 living with them, 64.95% were married couples living together, 4.08% had a female householder with no spouse present, and 27.45% were non-families. 23.40% of all households were made up of individuals, and 11.40% had someone living alone who was 65 years of age or older. The average household size was 2.49 and the average family size was 2.98.

The township's age distribution consisted of 22.2% under the age of 18, 6.9% from 18 to 24, 20.3% from 25 to 44, 27% from 45 to 64, and 23.7% who were 65 years of age or older. The median age was 45.6 years. For every 100 females, there were 111.5 males. For every 100 females age 18 and over, there were 103.7 males.

The median income for a household in the township was $56,875, and the median income for a family was $71,250. Males had a median income of $42,222 versus $31,071 for females. The per capita income for the township was $29,163. About 6.7% of families and 8.3% of the population were below the poverty line, including 16.6% of those under age 18 and 1.8% of those age 65 or over.

School districts
 La Moille Community Unit School District 303
 Mendota Elementary School District 289
 Mendota High School District 280

Political districts
 Illinois's 11th congressional district
 State House District 76
 State Senate District 38

References
 
 US Census Bureau 2007 TIGER/Line Shapefiles
 US National Atlas

External links
 City-Data.com
 Illinois State Archives

Townships in Bureau County, Illinois
Populated places established in 1849
Townships in Illinois
1849 establishments in Illinois